Raghava is a 2002 Indian Telugu-language film directed by Y. Nageswara Rao and starring Suresh and Rajasree. The film was a box office failure.

Cast 
 Suresh as Raghava Reddy
 Rajasree as Anjali 
 Kota Srinivasa Rao as Lakshma Reddy
 Ranganath as Veera Reddy

Reception 
Jeevi of Idlebrain.com wrote that "Raghava is a badly made film with uninspiring story and direction". Gudipoodi Srihari of The Hindu wrote that "The film, with a focus on the faction fights in Rayalaseema, is rather disappointing".

A critic from Full Hyderabad wrote that "The film is nothing but an unabashed excuse to make money using what Tollywood considers the flavor of the season". Griddaluru Gopalrao of Zamin Ryot also a gave a negative review for the film, writing the film had a poor storyline and the director failed to handle the film's conflict properly.

References 

2000s Telugu-language films
2002 films